The face is a part of the body, the front of the head.

Face may also refer to:

Generic meanings
 Face (geometry), a flat (planar) surface that forms part of the boundary of a solid object
 Face (hieroglyph), a portrayal of the human face, frontal view.
 Face (mining), the surface where the mining work is advancing
 Face (sociological concept), dignity or prestige in social relations
 Face (graph theory)
 Clock face
 Rock face, a cliff or vertical surface on a large rock or mountain, especially a pyramidal peak
 Typeface in typography

Books and publications

 Face (novel), a novel by Benjamin Zephaniah
 The Face (Vance novel), a 1979 science fiction novel by Jack Vance
 The Face (Koontz novel), a 2003 novel by Dean Koontz
 The Face (magazine), a British music, fashion, and culture magazine
 The Face, a novel by Angela Elwell Hunt
 The Face (comics), a 1940s Columbia Comics superhero

Film and TV

Films
 The Magician (1958 film) or The Face
 The Face (1996 film), an American television film
 Face (1997 film), a British crime drama by Antonia Bird
 Face (2000 film), a Japanese dark comedy by Junji Sakamoto and starring Naomi Fujiyama
 Face (2002 film), an American drama by Bertha Bay-Sa Pan and starring Bai Ling
 Face (2004 film), a Korean horror film by Yoo Sang-gon
 Face (2009 film), a Taiwanese-French comedy-drama by Tsai Ming-liang
 FACE Film Award of the Council of Europe, a human-rights award bestowed at the Istanbul International Film Festival

Television
 The Face (TV series), a multinational reality modeling-themed show
 The Face (American TV series), the original series
 The Face (Australian TV series)
 The Face Thailand
 The Face (British TV series)
 The Face (Vietnamese TV series)
 "Face" (Ghost in the Shell episode)
 Face (Nick Jr. mascot)
 Templeton Peck or Face, a character in The A-Team

Music

Performers
 Face (a cappella group), an American rock a cappella group
 The Face (band), a Chinese rock band formed in 1989
 Face (musician), a member of So Solid Crew
 Face (rapper) (born 1997), Russian rapper
 David Morales or the Face (born 1961), American house music DJ and producer

Albums
 Face (Of Cabbages and Kings album), 1988
 Face (Key album), 2018
 Face (Jimin album), 2023
 Face, a 2006 album by Kenna
 The Face: The Very Best of Visage, a 2010 album by Visage
 Face (EP), a 2022 EP by Solar
 The Face (album), a 2008 album by BoA
 The Face (EP), a 2012 EP by Disclosure

Songs
 "Face", a song by Brockhampton from Saturation
 "Face", a song by Got7 from 7 for 7
 "Face", a song by Rick Ross (featuring Trina) from Deeper Than Rap
 "Face", a song by Sevendust from Sevendust
 "The Face", a 1990 song by And Why Not?
 "The Face", ' a 1974 song by Gentle Giant from The Power and the Glory

Other
 Chery A1 Chery Face, a compact car produced by Chery Automobile
The Face, the world's first-ever  graded rock climb by Jerry Moffatt.

 Face (professional wrestling), a hero character, meant to appeal to wrestling fans

Acronyms
 FACE, Families Advocating for Campus Equality, a non-profit organization in the United States
 Fellow of the Australian College of Educators
 First Aid Convention Europe, a Red Cross event
 Federal Agency for Civic Education, a German government agency
 Federation of Associations for Hunting and Conservation of the EU, an advocacy group in the European Union
 Femmes algériennes pour un changement vers l'égalité, an Algerian feminist group created during the 2019 Hirak protests
 Fine Arts Core Education, a fine-arts school in Montreal, Quebec, Canada
 Fondation Agir Contre l'Exclusion, a private foundation in France
 Foundation for Arts, Culture and Education in Pakistan
 Fluorophore-assisted carbohydrate electrophoresis, a biochemical technology
 Free-air concentration enrichment, a technology to test the effect of rising CO2-levels on the production of plant biomass
 Freedom of Access to Clinic Entrances Act, a federal law in the United States
 Functional Analysis of Care Environments, a commercial tool for mental health risk assessment
 Future Airborne Capability Environment, a standards-based computing environment for aviation platforms
 F.A.C.E., a mnemonic for notes in the treble clef

People with the surname
 Richard Face (born 1942), Australian former politician
 Roy Face (born 1928), American former Major League Baseball relief pitcher

See also
 About Face (disambiguation)
 Bald face (disambiguation)
 Captain Face, in the 1610 play The Alchemist by Ben Jonson
 Face Down (disambiguation)
 Faces (disambiguation)
 Facing (disambiguation)
 Front (disambiguation)